Adrián Eduardo 'Carucha' Fernández (born 28 November 1980) is an Argentine former professional footballer who played as a striker.

Career
Fernández was born in General San Martín Partido, Greater Buenos Aires. Between 1998 and 2003, 'Carucha' played in second-line Argentine football teams, such as Nueva Chicago and El Porvenir. In spite of his poor background, during 2004, Fernandez arrived at Colo-Colo.

In Colo Colo, Fernández debuted in the most important match in the Chilean league: the superclásico (Colo Colo v/s Universidad de Chile).

After his Chilean experience, 'Carucha' played in the Bolivian The Strongest, Saudi Arabia and in the Swiss league.

In July 2008 he went to Bulgaria and signed with Cherno More Varna. On 14 November 2008, he scored two goals for Cherno More in the most important match against Spartak Varna (The derby of Varna) at Ticha Stadium. He scored goals in the 60th and 73rd minute. The result of the match was a 5–0 win for Cherno More.

In January 2009 Fernández signed a contract with Chernomorets Burgas. Up to the end of the 2008–09 season he played in 11 matches for the club and scored 5 goals. On 7 December 2010, he was released from Chernomorets Burgas.

On 15 July 2011, Fernández signed a contract with Israeli second league team Hapoel Ramat Gan. At Hapoel Ramat Gan he scored 10 goals in 28 matches. On 30 May 2012, he signed a contract with Ironi Ramat Hasharon for one season. On 31 May 2013, he signed a contract with the third Israeli team in his career, Hapoel Petah Tikva. On 8 September 2013, Fernández debuted in a match against Hapoel Katamon, in this match he scored his first goal for Petah Tikva in the 26th minute.

On 26 August 2014, he signed to Maccabi Herzliya.

External links

 
 
 
 

1980 births
Living people
People from General San Martín Partido
Sportspeople from Buenos Aires Province
Association football forwards
Argentine footballers
Argentine expatriate footballers
Nueva Chicago footballers
El Porvenir footballers
Colo-Colo footballers
The Strongest players
Al-Shaab CSC players
FC Schaffhausen players
Swiss Super League players
Chilean Primera División players
First Professional Football League (Bulgaria) players
PFC Cherno More Varna players
PFC Chernomorets Burgas players
Hapoel Nir Ramat HaSharon F.C. players
Hapoel Ramat Gan F.C. players
Hapoel Petah Tikva F.C. players
Maccabi Herzliya F.C. players
Liga Leumit players
Israeli Premier League players
Argentine expatriate sportspeople in Bulgaria
Argentine expatriate sportspeople in Switzerland
Argentine expatriate sportspeople in Bolivia
Argentine expatriate sportspeople in Chile
Argentine expatriate sportspeople in Israel
Expatriate footballers in Bulgaria
Expatriate footballers in Switzerland
Expatriate footballers in Chile
Expatriate footballers in Bolivia
Expatriate footballers in Israel
UAE Pro League players